Leirhøi or Leirhøe is a mountain in Lom Municipality in Innlandet county, Norway. The mountain is surrounded by several other notable mountains including Spiterhøi and Skauthøi to the northwest; Veobreahesten and Veopallan to the northeast; Veotinden and Veobretinden to the southeast; Store Memurutinden to the south; and Nørdre Hellstugutinden, Midtre Hellstugutinden, Store Hellstugutinden, and Nestsøre Hellstugutinden to the southwest.

Name
The mountain is named after the lake Leirtjønne or the brook Leirgrove. The last element is the finite form of hø which means '(large) round mountain'. The name of the lake is a compound of leir which means 'clay', and the finite form of tjønn which means 'tarn' or 'small lake'. The last element in the name of the river is the finite form of grov which means 'brook'.

See also
List of mountains of Norway by height

References

Jotunheimen
Lom, Norway
Mountains of Innlandet